Loncopán also known as Lonkopan (b. unknown, died 1853), was a Tschen chief and also a general of the Argentine Army. Son of Al-Aan, he was part of the Boreal Tehuelches Tschen, sometimes confused with the Pampas and Puelches günün a künna. Of nomadic character, the tschen travelled through the south area of the provinces of Buenos Aires, La Pampa and Cordoba.

Confederación Indígena Americana 
He forged alliances with Calfulcurá and received protection from Don Juan Manuel de Rosas. Tried the peaceful unification of all Native nations in a large American Native Confederation (Confederación Indígena Americana), but the lack of communications and the disparity of interests made it fail. He had a large army and controlled much of the strategic "rastrillas" (trade routes) in southern Buenos Aires province.

After the battle of Caseros, he refused to participate in the war against the Government, causing a rupture with the chief Cafulcurá. Flanked by internal divisions, the tribe is attacked and absorbed by the tehuelches of Gervasio Chipitruz.

References 
 1860a. Description géographique et statistique de la Confédération Argentine. Libro Total PDF 26.389 kb. Tomo I. Tomo Primero. París, 1860. Librerie Firmín Didot
 1860b. Description géographique et statistique de la Confédération Argentine. Libro Total PDF 29.517 kb. Tomo II. Tomo Segundo. París, 1860. Librerie Firmín Didot
 Rectificaciones y ratificaciones hacia una interpretación definitiva del panorama etnológico de la Patagonia y área septentrional adyacente. Escrito por Rodolfo M. Casamiquela, Universidad Nacional del Sur. Instituto de humanidades. Publicado por Instituto de Humanidades, Universidad Nacional del Sur, 1965

External links 
Alain Fabre 2005- Ethnolinguistic Dictionary and bibliographic guide of the native people of South America

1853 deaths
Argentine Army officers
Year of birth unknown